"Ah! Leah!" is a song by Mark Avsec and American rock musician Donnie Iris from the latter's 1980 album Back on the Streets. The song has been described as Iris's signature song, as well the unofficial anthem of the city of Pittsburgh and Western Pennsylvania as a whole.

Eight musicians appeared in early live performances of the song, including lead singer Iris, a drummer, three guitar players, a keyboard player and at least two backing vocalists, one female and one male.

The title of the song has been referred to in the form of puns on a few of Iris's later albums—the 2009 live album Ah! Live! and the 2010 Christmas album Ah! Leluiah!.

Composition
Iris said, 

A 2008 report by The Beaver County Times revealed that the Leah in question was Leah Frankford of Chippewa Township, Pennsylvania near Iris's hometown of Ellwood City. Frankford had moved to Florida just before The Jaggerz hit it big, and got confirmation from Iris himself after Iris's girlfriend by chance became friends with Frankford's daughter through Iris's mortgage business. Frankford had moved back to Beaver County by the time the song came out, and always noticed many girls at her two daughters softball games also named Leah.

Chart performance
It was released as a single in late 1980 and reached number 29 on the US Billboard Hot 100, 22 on the Cash Box Top 100 and 19 on the US Billboard Top Tracks chart, and was most popular in Canada, where it became a Top 10 hit.

Weekly charts

Year-end charts

In popular culture
The song has become the unofficial anthem of the city of Pittsburgh and remains a staple on local radio stations alongside Iris's other hit songs such as The Rapper and Love is Like a Rock. It has also made appearances involving Pittsburgh's sports teams, including by the Pittsburgh Pirates at PNC Park and used as bumper music by NBC whenever the Pittsburgh Steelers play on NBC Sunday Night Football.

Album appearances
 Back on the Streets, 1980
 Out of the Blue, 1992
 Live! At Nick's Fat City, 1998 (live)
 Together Alone, 1999 (acoustic)
 20th Century Masters: The Millennium Collection: The Best of Donnie Iris, 2001
 25 Years, 2004 (live)
 Ah! Live!, 2009 (live)

Cover versions
Electric Six covered the song on their cover-album Mimicry and Memories (2015).

References

External links
Lyrics

JC Mosquito, "Donnie Iris, “Ah! Leah!” (1981): Almost Hits", Something Else, 12 February 2013

Donnie Iris songs
1980 debut singles
Songs written by Mark Avsec
Songs written by Donnie Iris
1980 songs